Keep Moving is the debut solo extended play (EP) by Australian musician Andrew Stockdale. Recorded throughout 2012 and 2013 in Byron Bay, the EP features four songs from Stockdale's debut solo album of the same name. It was released by Universal on 26 April 2013 in Australia, Germany and Austria, on 28 April in the United Kingdom and the rest of Europe, and on 30 April in the United States.

Track listing

Personnel
Andrew Stockdale – vocals, guitars, organ (track 3)
Ian Peres – bass, organ and Wurlitzer electric piano (track 1)
Elliott Hammond – Wurlitzer electric piano and bongos (track 1), drums (track 3)
Vin Steele – rhythm guitar (tracks 1 and 4)
Hamish Rosser – drums (tracks 1 and 4)
Will Rockwell-Scott – drums (track 2)
Alex "Rudy" Markwell – rhythm guitar (track 3)

Release history

References

2013 EPs
Andrew Stockdale albums